A Spoonful of Miracle is the debut studio album by Praga Khan. It was released in 1993 and is credited as Praga Khan & Jade 4 U. With the exception of the tracks "Give Me Your Lovin'", Flesh & Blood", "I Will Survive", and "Love-Peace-Freedom", all of the songs are featured on his next studio album, Conquers Your Love. The songs "Injected with a Poison", "Phantasia Forever", "Moonday", and "Love Me Baby" are different mixes than those on Conquers Your Love.

Track listing

 "Injected with a Poison" – 5:03
 "Phantasia Forever" – 3:45
 "I Feel Good" – 3:14
 "Give Me Your Lovin'" – 4:26
 "Rave Alert" – 3:56
 "Moonday" – 3:11
 "Travel Through Time" – 3:24
 "God of Abraham" – 3:43
 "Flesh & Blood" – 3:46
 "Love Me Baby" – 3:48
 "I Will Survive" – 3:59
 "Love-Peace-Freedom" – 3:59

References

1993 debut albums
Praga Khan albums